The Liberal Party of Australia is a centre-right political party in Australia, one of the two major parties in Australian politics, along with the centre-left Australian Labor Party. It was founded in 1944 as the successor to the United Australia Party and has since become the most successful political party in Australia's history.

The Liberal Party is the dominant partner in the Coalition with the National Party of Australia. At the federal level, the Liberal Party and its predecessors have been in coalition with the National Party since the 1920s. The Coalition was most recently in power from the 2013 federal election to the 2022 federal election, forming the Abbott (2013–2015), Turnbull (2015–2018) and Morrison (2018–2022) governments. The current party leader is Peter Dutton, who replaced former prime minister Scott Morrison as leader after the Coalition's defeat at the 2022 federal election.

The Liberal Party has a federal structure, with autonomous divisions in all six states and the Australian Capital Territory (ACT). The Country Liberal Party (CLP) of the Northern Territory is an affiliate. Both the CLP and the Liberal National Party (LNP), the Queensland state division, were formed through mergers of the local Liberal and National parties. At state and territory level, the Liberal Party is in office in two states: New South Wales since 2011 and Tasmania since 2014. The party is in opposition in the states of Victoria, Queensland, South Australia, and Western Australia, and in both the ACT and Northern Territory.

The party's ideology has been referred to as conservative, liberal-conservative, conservative-liberal, and classical liberal. The Liberal Party tends to promote economic liberalism, and social conservatism. Two past leaders of the party, Sir Robert Menzies and John Howard, are Australia's two longest-serving Prime Ministers.

History

Party Foundation

The Liberals' immediate predecessor was the United Australia Party (UAP). More broadly, the Liberal Party's ideological ancestry stretched back to the anti-Labor groupings in the first Commonwealth parliaments. The Commonwealth Liberal Party was a fusion of the Free Trade (Anti-socialist) Party and the Protectionist Party in 1909 by the second prime minister, Alfred Deakin, in response to Labor's growing electoral prominence. The Commonwealth Liberal Party merged with several Labor dissidents (including Billy Hughes) to form the Nationalist Party of Australia in 1917. That party, in turn, merged with Labor dissidents to form the UAP in 1931.

The UAP had been formed as a new conservative alliance in 1931, with Labor defector Joseph Lyons as its leader. The stance of Lyons and other Labor rebels against the more radical proposals of the Labor movement to deal the Great Depression had attracted the support of prominent Australian conservatives. With Australia still suffering the effects of the Great Depression, the newly formed party won a landslide victory at the 1931 Election, and the Lyons Government went on to win three consecutive elections. It largely avoided Keynesian pump-priming and pursued a more conservative fiscal policy of debt reduction and balanced budgets as a means of stewarding Australia out of the Depression. Lyons' death in 1939 saw Robert Menzies assume the Prime Ministership on the eve of war. Menzies served as Prime Minister from 1939 to 1941 but resigned as leader of the minority World War II government amidst an unworkable parliamentary majority. The UAP, led by Billy Hughes, disintegrated after suffering a heavy defeat in the 1943 election.  In New South Wales, the party merged with the Commonwealth Party to form the Democratic Party, In Queensland the state party was absorbed into the Queensland People's Party.

From 1942 onward Menzies had maintained his public profile with his series of "The Forgotten People" radio talks—similar to Franklin D. Roosevelt's "fireside chats" of the 1930s—in which he spoke of the middle class as the "backbone of Australia" but as nevertheless having been "taken for granted" by political parties.

Menzies called a conference of conservative parties and other groups opposed to the ruling Australian Labor Party, which met in Canberra on 13 October 1944 and again in Albury, New South Wales in December 1944. Outlining his vision for a new political movement, Menzies said:

The formation of the party was formally announced at Sydney Town Hall on 31 August 1945. It took the name "Liberal" in honour of the old Commonwealth Liberal Party. The new party was dominated by the remains of the old UAP; with few exceptions, the UAP party room became the Liberal Party room. The Australian Women's National League, a powerful conservative women's organisation, also merged with the new party. A conservative youth group Menzies had set up, the Young Nationalists, was also merged into the new party. It became the nucleus of the Liberal Party's youth division, the Young Liberals. By September 1945 there were more than 90,000 members, many of whom had not previously been members of any political party.

In New South Wales, the New South Wales division of the Liberal Party replaced the Liberal Democratic Party and Democratic Party between January and April 1945. In Queensland, the Queensland People's Party did not become part of the Liberal Party until July 1949, when it became the Queensland division of the Liberal Party.

Menzies Era

After an initial loss to Labor at the 1946 election, Menzies led the Liberals to victory at the 1949 election, and the party stayed in office for a record 23 years— the longest unbroken run ever in government at the federal level. Australia experienced prolonged economic growth during the post-war boom period of the Menzies Government (1949–1966) and Menzies fulfilled his promises at the 1949 election to end rationing of butter, tea and petrol and provided a five-shilling endowment for first-born children, as well as for others. While himself an unashamed anglophile, Menzies' government concluded a number of major defence and trade treaties that set Australia on its post-war trajectory out of Britain's orbit; opened up Australia to multi-ethnic immigration; and instigated important legal reforms regarding Aboriginal Australians.

Menzies was strongly opposed to Labor's plans to nationalise the Australian banking system and, following victory at the 1949 election, secured a double dissolution election for April 1951, after the Labor-controlled Senate rejected his banking legislation. The Liberal-Country Coalition was returned with control of the Senate. The Government was re-elected again at the 1954 election; the formation of the anti-Communist Democratic Labor Party (DLP) and the consequent split in the Australian Labor Party early in 1955 helped the Liberals to secure another victory in December 1955. John McEwen replaced Arthur Fadden as leader of the Country Party in March 1958 and the Menzies-McEwen Coalition was returned again at elections in November 1958—their third victory against Labor's H. V. Evatt. The Coalition was narrowly returned against Labor's Arthur Calwell in the December 1961 election, in the midst of a credit squeeze. Menzies stood for office for the last time at the November 1963 election, again defeating Calwell, with the Coalition winning back its losses in the House of Representatives. Menzies went on to resign from parliament on 26 January 1966.

Menzies came to power the year the Communist Party of Australia had led a coal strike to improve pit miners' working conditions. That same year Joseph Stalin's Soviet Union exploded its first atomic bomb, and Mao Zedong led the Chinese Communist Party to power in China; a year later came the invasion of South Korea by Communist North Korea. Anti-communism was a key political issue of the 1950s and 1960s. Menzies was firmly anti-Communist; he committed troops to the Korean War and attempted to ban the Communist Party of Australia in an unsuccessful referendum during the course of that war. The Labor Party split over concerns about the influence of the Communist Party over the Trade Union movement, leading to the foundation of the breakaway Democratic Labor Party whose preferences supported the Liberal and Country parties.

In 1951, during the early stages of the Cold War, Menzies spoke of the possibility of a looming third world war. The Menzies Government entered Australia's first formal military alliance outside of the British Commonwealth with the signing of the ANZUS Treaty between Australia, New Zealand and the United States in San Francisco in 1951. External Affairs Minister Percy Spender had put forward the proposal to work along similar lines to the NATO Alliance. The Treaty declared that any attack on one of the three parties in the Pacific area would be viewed as a threat to each, and that the common danger would be met in accordance with each nation's constitutional processes. In 1954, the Menzies Government signed the South East Asia Collective Defence Treaty (SEATO) as a South East Asian counterpart to NATO. That same year, Soviet diplomat Vladimir Petrov and his wife defected from the Soviet embassy in Canberra, revealing evidence of Russian spying activities; Menzies called a Royal Commission to investigate.

In 1956, a committee headed by Sir Keith Murray was established to inquire into the financial plight of Australia's universities, and Menzies injected funds into the sector under conditions which preserved the autonomy of universities.

Menzies continued the expanded immigration program established under Chifley, and took important steps towards dismantling the White Australia Policy. In the early-1950s, external affairs minister Percy Spender helped to establish the Colombo Plan for providing economic aid to underdeveloped nations in Australia's region. Under that scheme many future Asian leaders studied in Australia. In 1958, the government replaced the Immigration Act's arbitrarily applied European language dictation test with an entry permit system, that reflected economic and skills criteria. In 1962, Menzies' Commonwealth Electoral Act provided that all Indigenous Australians should have the right to enrol and vote at federal elections (prior to this, indigenous people in Queensland, Western Australia and some in the Northern Territory had been excluded from voting unless they were ex-servicemen). In 1949, the Liberals appointed Dame Enid Lyons as the first woman to serve in an Australian Cabinet. Menzies remained a staunch supporter of links to the monarchy and British Commonwealth but formalised an alliance with the United States and concluded the Agreement on Commerce between Australia and Japan which was signed in July 1957 and launched post-war trade with Japan, beginning a growth of Australian exports of coal, iron ore and mineral resources that would steadily climb until Japan became Australia's largest trading partner.

Menzies retired in 1966 as Australia's longest-serving Prime Minister.

Holt Government

Harold Holt replaced the retiring Robert Menzies in 1966 and the Holt Government went on to win 82 seats to Labor's 41 at the 1966 election. Holt remained Prime Minister until 19 December 1967, when he was declared presumed dead two days after disappearing in rough surf in which he had gone for a swim. His body has never been found.

Holt increased Australian commitment to the growing War in Vietnam, which met with some public opposition. His government oversaw conversion to decimal currency. Holt faced Britain's withdrawal from Asia by visiting and hosting many Asian leaders and by expanding ties to the United States, hosting the first visit to Australia by an American president, his friend Lyndon B. Johnson. Holt's government introduced the Migration Act 1966, which effectively dismantled the White Australia Policy and increased access to non-European migrants, including refugees fleeing the Vietnam War. Holt also called the 1967 Referendum which removed the discriminatory clause in the Australian Constitution which excluded Aboriginal Australians from being counted in the census – the referendum was one of the few to be overwhelmingly endorsed by the Australian electorate (over 90% voted "Yes"). By the end of 1967, the Liberals' initially popular support for the war in Vietnam was causing increasing public protest.

Gorton Government

The Liberals chose John Gorton to replace Holt. Gorton, a former World War II Royal Australian Air Force pilot, with a battle scarred face, said he was "Australian to the bootheels" and had a personal style which often affronted some conservatives.

The Gorton Government increased funding for the arts, setting up the Australian Council for the Arts, the Australian Film Development Corporation and the National Film and Television Training School. The Gorton Government passed legislation establishing equal pay for men and women and increased pensions, allowances and education scholarships, as well as providing free health care to 250,000 of the nation's poor (but not universal health care). Gorton's government kept Australia in the Vietnam War but stopped replacing troops at the end of 1970.

Gorton maintained good relations with the United States and Britain, but pursued closer ties with Asia. The Gorton government experienced a decline in voter support at the 1969 election. State Liberal leaders saw his policies as too centralist, while other Liberals didn't like his personal behaviour. In 1971, Defence Minister Malcolm Fraser, resigned and said Gorton was "not fit to hold the great office of Prime Minister". In a vote on the leadership the Liberal Party split 50/50, and although this was insufficient to remove him as the leader, Gorton decided this was also insufficient support for him, and he resigned.

McMahon Government and Snedden leadership

Former treasurer, William McMahon, replaced Gorton as Prime Minister. Gorton remained a front bencher but relations with Fraser remained strained. The McMahon Government ended when Gough Whitlam led the Australian Labor Party out of its 23-year period in Opposition at the 1972 election.

The economy was weakening. McMahon maintained Australia's diminishing commitment to Vietnam and criticised Opposition leader, Gough Whitlam, for visiting Communist China in 1972—only to have the US President Richard Nixon announce a planned visit soon after.

During McMahon's period in office, Neville Bonner joined the Senate and became the first Indigenous Australian in the Australian Parliament. Bonner was chosen by the Liberal Party to fill a Senate vacancy in 1971 and celebrated his maiden parliamentary speech with a boomerang throwing display on the lawns of Parliament. Bonner went on to win election at the 1972 election and served as a Liberal Senator for 12 years. He worked on Indigenous and social welfare issues and proved an independent minded Senator, often crossing the floor on Parliamentary votes.

Following Whitlam's victory, John Gorton played a further role in reform by introducing a Parliamentary motion from Opposition supporting the legalisation of same-gender sexual relations. Billy Snedden led the party against Whitlam in the 1974 federal election, which saw a return of the Labor government. When Malcolm Fraser won the Liberal Party leadership from Snedden in 1975, Gorton walked out of the Party Room.

Fraser years

Following the 1974–75 Loans Affair, the Malcolm Fraser led Liberal-Country Party Coalition argued that the Whitlam Government was incompetent and delayed passage of the Government's money bills in the Senate, until the government would promise a new election. Whitlam refused, yet Fraser insisted leading to the divisive 1975 Australian constitutional crisis. The deadlock came to an end when the Whitlam government was controversially dismissed by the Governor-General, Sir John Kerr on 11 November 1975 and Fraser was installed as caretaker Prime Minister, pending an election. Fraser won in a landslide at the resulting 1975 election.

Fraser maintained some of the social reforms of the Whitlam era, while seeking increased fiscal restraint. His government included the first Aboriginal federal parliamentarian, Neville Bonner, and in 1976, Parliament passed the Aboriginal Land Rights Act 1976, which, while limited to the Northern Territory, affirmed "inalienable" freehold title to some traditional lands. Fraser established the multicultural broadcaster SBS, accepted Vietnamese refugees, opposed minority white rule in apartheid South Africa and Rhodesia and opposed Soviet expansionism. A significant program of economic reform, however, was not pursued. By 1983, the Australian economy was suffering with the early 1980s recession and amidst the effects of a severe drought. Fraser had promoted "states' rights" and his government refused to use Commonwealth powers to stop the construction of the Franklin Dam in Tasmania in 1982. Liberal minister Don Chipp split off from the party to form a new social liberal party, the Australian Democrats in 1977. Fraser won further substantial majorities at the 1977 and 1980 elections, before losing to the Bob Hawke-led Australian Labor Party in the 1983 election.

Opposition (1983–1996)

A period of division for the Liberals followed, with former Treasurer John Howard competing with former Foreign Minister Andrew Peacock for supremacy. The Australian economy was facing the early 1990s recession. Unemployment reached 11.4% in 1992. Under Dr John Hewson, in November 1991, the opposition launched the 650-page Fightback! policy document—a radical collection of "dry", economic liberal measures including the introduction of a Goods and Services Tax (GST), various changes to Medicare including the abolition of bulk billing for non-concession holders, the introduction of a nine-month limit on unemployment benefits, various changes to industrial relations including the abolition of awards, a $13 billion personal income tax cut directed at middle and upper income earners, $10 billion in government spending cuts, the abolition of state payroll taxes and the privatisation of a large number of government owned enterprises − representing the start of a very different future direction to the keynesian economic policies practised by previous Liberal/National Coalition governments. The 15 percent GST was the centerpiece of the policy document. Through 1992, Labor Prime Minister Paul Keating mounted a campaign against the Fightback package, and particularly against the GST, which he described as an attack on the working class in that it shifted the tax burden from direct taxation of the wealthy to indirect taxation as a broad-based consumption tax. Pressure group activity and public opinion was relentless, which led Hewson to exempt food from the proposed GST—leading to questions surrounding the complexity of what food was and wasn't to be exempt from the GST. Hewson's difficulty in explaining this to the electorate was exemplified in the infamous birthday cake interview, considered by some as a turning point in the election campaign. Keating won a record fifth consecutive Labor term at the 1993 election. A number of the proposals were later adopted into law in some form, to a small extent during the Keating Labor government, and to a larger extent during the Howard Liberal government (most famously the GST), while unemployment benefits and bulk billing were re-targeted for a time by the Abbott Liberal government.

Howard Government

Labor's Paul Keating lost the 1996 Election to the Liberals' John Howard. The Liberals had been in Opposition for 13 years. With John Howard as Prime Minister, Peter Costello as Treasurer and Alexander Downer as Foreign Minister, the Howard Government remained in power until their electoral defeat to Kevin Rudd in 2007.

Howard generally framed the Liberals as being conservative on social policy, debt reduction and matters like maintaining Commonwealth links and the American Alliance but his premiership saw booming trade with Asia and expanding multiethnic immigration. His government concluded the Australia-United States Free Trade Agreement with the Bush Administration in 2004.

Howard differed from his Labor predecessor Paul Keating in that he supported traditional Australian institutions like the Monarchy in Australia, the commemoration of ANZAC Day and the design of the Australian flag, but like Keating he pursued privatisation of public utilities and the introduction of a broad based consumption tax (although Keating had dropped support for a GST by the time of his 1993 election victory). Howard's premiership coincided with Al Qaeda's 11 September attacks on the United States. The Howard Government invoked the ANZUS treaty in response to the attacks and supported America's campaigns in Afghanistan and Iraq.

In the 2004 Federal elections the party strengthened its majority in the Lower House and, with its coalition partners, became the first federal government in twenty years to gain an absolute majority in the Senate. This control of both houses permitted their passing of legislation without the need to negotiate with independents or minor parties, exemplified by industrial relations legislation known as WorkChoices, a wide-ranging effort to increase deregulation of industrial laws in Australia.

In 2005, Howard reflected on his government's cultural and foreign policy outlook in oft repeated terms:

The 2007 federal election saw the defeat of the Howard federal government, and the Liberal Party was in opposition throughout Australia at the state and federal level; the highest Liberal office-holder at the time was Lord Mayor of Brisbane Campbell Newman. This ended after the 2008 Western Australian state election, when Colin Barnett became Premier of that state.

State and territory level up to 2007

At the state level, the Liberals have been dominant for long periods in all states except Queensland, where they have always held fewer seats than the National party. The Liberals were in power in Victoria from 1955 to 1982. Jeff Kennett led the party back to office in that state in 1992, and remained Premier until 1999.

In South Australia, initially a Liberal and Country Party affiliated party, the Liberal and Country League (LCL), mostly led by Premier of South Australia Tom Playford, was in power from the 1933 election to the 1965 election, though with assistance from an electoral malapportionment, or gerrymander, known as the Playmander. The LCL's Steele Hall governed for one term from the 1968 election to the 1970 election and during this time began the process of dismantling the Playmander. David Tonkin, as leader of the South Australian Division of the Liberal Party of Australia, became Premier at the 1979 election for one term, losing office at the 1982 election. The Liberals returned to power at the 1993 election, led by Premiers Dean Brown, John Olsen and Rob Kerin through two terms, until their defeat at the 2002 election. They remained in opposition for 16 years, under a record five Opposition Leaders, until Steven Marshall led the party to victory in 2018.

The dual aligned Country Liberal Party governed the Northern Territory from 1978 to 2001.

The party has held office in Western Australia intermittently since 1947. Liberal Richard Court was Premier of the state for most of the 1990s.

In New South Wales, the Liberal Party has not been in office as much as its Labor rival, and just three leaders have led the party from opposition to government in that state: Sir Robert Askin, who was premier from 1965 to 1975, Nick Greiner, who came to office in 1988 and resigned in 1992, and Barry O'Farrell who led the party out of 16 years in opposition in 2011.

The Liberal Party does not officially contest most local government elections, although many members do run for office in local government as independents. An exception is the Brisbane City Council, where both Sallyanne Atkinson and Campbell Newman have been elected Lord Mayor of Brisbane.

Opposition (2007–2013)

Following the 2007 federal election, Dr Brendan Nelson was elected leader by the Parliamentary Liberal Party. On 16 September 2008, in a second contest following a spill motion, Nelson lost the leadership to Malcolm Turnbull. On 1 December 2009, a subsequent leadership election saw Turnbull lose the leadership to Tony Abbott by 42 votes to 41 on the second ballot. Abbott led the party to the 2010 federal election, which saw an increase in the Liberal Party vote and resulted in the first hung parliament since the 1940 election.

Through 2010, the party remained in opposition at the Tasmanian and South Australian state elections and achieved state government in Victoria. In March 2011, the New South Wales Liberal-National Coalition led by Barry O'Farrell won government with the largest election victory in post-war Australian history at the State Election. In Queensland, the Liberal and National parties merged in 2008 to form the new Liberal National Party of Queensland (registered as the Queensland Division of the Liberal Party of Australia). In March 2012, the new party achieved Government in an historic landslide, led by former Brisbane Lord Mayor, Campbell Newman.

In March 2013, the Western Australian Liberal-National government won re-election, and Tony Abbott led the party to government at the 2013 Australian Federal Election.

Abbott, Turnbull and Morrison governments

The party won government in Tasmania in 2014 and lost their fourth election in a row at the South Australian election. However, the Victorian Liberal-National government, now led by Denis Napthine, became the first one term government in Victoria in 60 years. Similarly, just two months later, the Liberal National government in Queensland was defeated just three years after its historic landslide victory. The New South Wales Liberal-National Coalition, however, managed to win re-election in March 2015. In 2016 the Federal Liberals narrowly won re-election in July 2016 while the Liberal-affiliated Country Liberals suffered a historic defeat in the Northern Territory and Canberra Liberals lost their fifth election in a row in October 2016. The Liberals fared little better in 2017 with the Barnett-led Liberal-National government in Western Australia also suffered a landslide defeat in March.

Abbott government

Turnbull government

Turnbull's time in office saw tensions between Moderate and Conservative factions within the Liberal Party.

On 21 August 2018 after a week of mounting pressure on Turnbull's leadership over his handling of energy policy and election strategy, the prime minister used the regular party-room meeting to spill the party leadership in an attempt to head off a growing conservative-led move against him by Home Affairs Minister Peter Dutton.  Turnbull survived the challenge, winning 48 votes to Dutton's 35. 
A further spill was called by Turnbull, in which he declined to stand and the leadership of the party was decided in favour of Treasurer Scott Morrison, over Dutton.

Morrison government
In August 2018, Home Affairs Minister Peter Dutton unsuccessfully challenged Turnbull for the leadership of the Liberal Party. Leadership tension continued, and the party voted to hold a second leadership ballot on 24 August, with Turnbull choosing not to stand. In that ballot, Morrison was seen as a compromise candidate and defeated both Dutton and Foreign Minister Julie Bishop to become leader of the Liberal Party. He was sworn in as prime minister by the governor-general later that day. Morrison went on to lead the Coalition to an unexpected victory in the 2019 election.

2022 outcome

In the 2022 election, the Liberal Party lost control of the Australian Parliament. During the election, which also saw Morrison resign as Liberal Leader and Liberal Deputy Leader Josh Frydenberg lose his seat in Parliament, the Liberal Party lost what was determined to be the most significant number of seats since the Party's creation in 1944. The departure of Morrison and Frydenberg's defeat made recent Leader of the House and Minister for Defence Peter Dutton the only viable candidate to become the next Liberal Party leader.

Ideology and factions 

As of 2021, the Liberal Party currently consists of three broad factional groupings: a moderate wing, a centre-right wing and a right wing, led by Simon Birmingham, Scott Morrison and Peter Dutton respectively.

The Liberal Party generally advocates conservative policies including economic liberalism. Historically, the party has supported a higher degree of economic protectionism and interventionism than it has in recent decades. However, from its foundation the party has identified itself as an anti-socialist grouping of liberals and conservatives. Strong opposition to socialism and communism in Australia and abroad was one of its founding principles. The party's founder and longest-serving leader Robert Menzies envisaged that Australia's middle class would form its main constituency.

Towards the end of his term as Prime Minister of Australia and in a final address to the Liberal Party Federal Council in 1964, Menzies spoke of the "Liberal Creed" as follows:

Soon after the election of the Howard Government the new Prime Minister John Howard, who was to become the second-longest serving Liberal Prime Minister, spoke of his interpretation of the "Liberal Tradition" in a Robert Menzies Lecture in 1996:

Until the 2022 election, the Liberals were in electoral terms largely the party of the middle class (whom Menzies, in the era of the party's formation called "The forgotten people"), though such class-based voting patterns are no longer as clear as they once were. In the 1970s a left-wing middle class emerged that no longer voted Liberal. One effect of this was the success of a breakaway party, the Australian Democrats, founded in 1977 by former Liberal minister Don Chipp and members of minor liberal parties. During the prime ministership of John Howard, the Liberals did increasingly well among socially conservative working-class voters. Until 2022 the Liberal Party's key support base remained the upper-middle classes— in 2010, 16 of the 20 richest federal electorates were held by the Liberals, most of which were safe seats. Following the 2022 election, 16 of the 20 poorest seats in Australia were held by the Liberal Party,  while it held only five of the 20 wealthiest electorates. In country areas they either compete with or have a truce with the Nationals, depending on various factors.

Menzies was an ardent constitutional monarchist, who supported the monarchy in Australia and links to the Commonwealth of Nations. Today the party is divided on the question of republicanism, with some (such as former leader Scott Morrison) being monarchists, while others (such as his predecessor Malcolm Turnbull) are republicans. The Menzies Government formalised Australia's alliance with the United States in 1951 and the party has remained a strong supporter of the mutual defence treaty.

Domestically, Menzies presided over a fairly regulated economy in which utilities were publicly owned, and commercial activity was highly regulated through centralised wage-fixing and high tariff protection. Liberal leaders from Menzies to Malcolm Fraser generally maintained Australia's high tariff levels. At that time the Liberals' coalition partner, the Country Party, the older of the two in the coalition (now known as the "National Party"), had considerable influence over the government's economic policies. It was not until the late 1970s and through their period out of power federally in the 1980s that the party came to be influenced by what was known as the "New Right"—a conservative liberal group who advocated market deregulation, privatisation of public utilities, reductions in the size of government programs and tax cuts.

Socially, while liberty and freedom of enterprise form the basis of its beliefs, elements of the party include both what is termed "small-l liberalism" and social conservatism. Historically, Liberal Governments have been responsible for the carriage of a number of notable "socially liberal" reforms, including the opening of Australia to multiethnic immigration under Menzies and Harold Holt; Holt's 1967 Referendum on Aboriginal Rights; John Gorton's support for cinema and the arts; selection of the first Aboriginal Senator, Neville Bonner, in 1971; and Malcolm Fraser's Aboriginal Land Rights Act 1976. A West Australian Liberal, Ken Wyatt, became the first Indigenous Australian elected to the House of Representatives in 2010.

The Prime Minister of Australia, Scott Morrison, stated the following in his 2019 victory speech;

This is, this is the best country in the world in which to live. It is those Australians that we have been working for, for the last five and a half years since we came to Government, under Tony Abbott's leadership back in 2013. It has been those Australians who have worked hard every day, they have their dreams, they have their aspirations; to get a job, to get an apprenticeship, to start a business, to meet someone amazing. To start a family, to buy a home, to work hard and provide the best you can for your kids. To save for your retirement and to ensure that when you're in your retirement, that you can enjoy it because you've worked hard for it. These are the quiet Australians who have won a great victory tonight.

The Liberal Party is a member of the International Democrat Union and the Asia Pacific Democrat Union.

Organisation
The Liberal Party's organisation is dominated by the six state divisions, reflecting the party's original commitment to a federalised system of government (a commitment which was strongly maintained by all Liberal governments bar the Gorton government until 1983, but was to a large extent abandoned by the Howard Government, which showed strong centralising tendencies). Menzies deliberately created a weak national party machine and strong state divisions. Party policy is made almost entirely by the parliamentary parties, not by the party's rank-and-file members, although Liberal party members do have a degree of influence over party policy.

The Liberal Party's basic organisational unit is the branch, which consists of party members in a particular locality. For each electorate there is a conference—notionally above the branches—which coordinates campaigning in the electorate and regularly communicates with the member (or candidate) for the electorate. As there are three levels of government in Australia, each branch elects delegates to a local, state, and federal conference.

All the branches in an Australian state are grouped into a Division. The ruling body for the Division is a State Council. There is also one Federal Council which represents the entire organisational Liberal Party in Australia. Branch executives are delegates to the Councils ex-officio and additional delegates are elected by branches, depending on their size.

Preselection of electoral candidates is performed by a special electoral college convened for the purpose. Membership of the electoral college consists of head office delegates, branch officers, and elected delegates from branches.

Federal parliamentary leaders

State and territory divisions 

For a brief period between 27 October 2020 (appointment of Elizabeth Lee as leader of Canberra Liberals) and 12 November 2020 (resignation of Deb Frecklington as leader of the LNP), five Liberal Party state and territory divisions were led by women, the highest number in Liberal Party history. The leaders were:
 ACT: Elizabeth Lee
 Queensland: Deb Frecklington
 New South Wales: Gladys Berejiklian
 Western Australia: Liza Harvey
 Northern Territory: Lia Finocchiaro

Federal presidents

Federal election results

House of Representatives

Donors 

For the 2015–2016 financial year, the top ten disclosed donors to the Liberal Party were: Paul Marks (Nimrod resources) ($1,300,000), Pratt Holdings ($790,000), Hong Kong Kingson Investment Company ($710,000), Aus Gold Mining Group ($410,000), Village Roadshow ($325,000), Waratah Group ($300,000), Walker Corporation ($225,000), Australian Gypsum Industries ($196,000), National Automotive Leasing and Salary Packaging Association ($177,000) and Westfield Corporation ($150,000).

The Liberal Party also receives undisclosed funding through several methods, such as "associated entities". Cormack Foundation, Eight by Five, Free Enterprise Foundation, Federal Forum and Northern Sydney Conservative forum are entities which have been used to funnel donations to the Liberal Party without disclosing the source.

See also

 Country Liberal Party (Northern Territory)
 Liberal National Party (Queensland)
 Liberal Party of Australia (New South Wales Division)
 Liberal Party of Australia (South Australian Division)
 Liberal Party of Australia (Tasmanian Division)
 Liberal Party of Australia (Victorian Division)
 List of political parties in Australia
 Turnbull Government
 Abbott Government
 Liberalism in Australia
Moderates
 Young Liberal Movement of Australia

Notes

References

Further reading 

 Henderson, Gerard (1994). Menzies' Child: The Liberal Party of Australia 1944–1994, Allen and Unwin, Sydney, New South Wales.
 Jaensch, Dean (1994) The Liberals, Allen and Unwin, Sydney, New South Wales.
 Nethercote, John (ed.)(2001), Liberalism and the Australian Federation, Federation Press, Annandale, New South Wales. 
 Simms, Marian (1982) A Liberal Nation: The Liberal Party and Australian Politics, Hale and Iremonger, Sydney, New South Wales. 
 Starr, Graeme (1980) The Liberal Party of Australia: A Documentary History, Drummond/Heinemann, Richmond, Victoria. 
 Tiver, P.G. (1978), The Liberal Party. Principles and Performance, Jacaranda, Milton, Queensland.

External links 

 
 Liberal Party of Australia ephemera digitised and held by the National Library of Australia
 Records of the Victorian division of the Liberal Party held at the University of Melbourne Archives

 
1945 establishments in Australia
Classical liberal parties
Conservative liberal parties
Conservative parties in Australia
International Democrat Union member parties
Liberal conservative parties
Liberal parties in Australia
Centre-right parties
Political parties established in 1945